Nicolai Lomov (February 9, 1946 – July 24, 2020) was a Russian classical pianist, who played with the Moscow Philharmonic Orchestra and the Leningrad Philharmonic Orchestra before emigrating to the United States.

Biography
Nicolai Lomov began playing piano at the age of three. At five, he was enrolled at the Mussorgsky State School for Gifted Children.  Lomov made his musical debut with the Ekaterinburg Philharmonic Orchestra, playing Tchaikovsky's Concerto in B-Flat Minor Op. 23 at 15.

His formative training took place at the Moscow Tchaikovsky State Conservatory, completing his Ph.D in 1971. 
In 1990, leaving behind a teaching position at the St. Petersburg Leningrad State Conservatory, he emigrated to the United States. Seven months later, he found himself in Boston, working as a dishwasher in the Federal Reserve Bank's sixth floor kitchen, while also teaching classes in piano. The documentary Nicolai Lomov, Russian Pianist and American Dishwasher chronicles this story.
After being "discovered" while working as a dishwasher, Lomov made his professional US stage debut with the Newton Symphony in Newton, Massachusetts in 1992. From 1992-1996, Lomov was a soloist with the Newton Symphony Orchestra as well as the New Hampshire Philharmonic.

Lomov has performed over 60 recitals in the eastern United States as well as Oklahoma. He taught young pianists in the Rhode Island and New England area. His students have included the pianists Marlon Daniels, Daniel Wnukowski, and Robert Laniewski.

Lomov died on July 24, 2020 at the age of 74 after complications from a stroke.

Recordings

References

Further reading

*

2020 deaths
Russian classical pianists
Male classical pianists
21st-century classical pianists
1946 births
21st-century Russian male musicians
Soviet emigrants to the United States